Altès is a surname. Notable people with the surname include:

 Ernest Eugène Altès (1830–1899), French violinist and conductor, brother of Joseph-Henri
 Joseph-Henri Altès (1826–1895), French flautist and composer

See also

Antes (name)